Ritsuko (written: 律子 lit. "law, child", りつ子 or リツ子), is a feminine Japanese given name. Notable people with the name include:

Ritsuko Hiroto (born 1981), Japanese cricketer
, Japanese writer
, Japanese singer
Ritsuko Mori (森律子, 1890–1961), Japanese actress
, Japanese bowler
, Japanese actress
, Japanese singer-songwriter
, Japanese actress, television personality and singer
, Japanese musician

Fictional characters
, a character in the anime series Neon Genesis Evangelion
, a character in the video game series THE iDOLM@STER
 Ritsuko Chikanari, a character in the video game Yandere Simulator
, a character in the novel Another

Japanese feminine given names